The Kleines Schreckhorn is a mountain of the Bernese Alps, located south of Grindelwald in the Bernese Oberland. It lies between the valleys of the Lower Grindelwald Glacier and the Upper Grindelwald Glacier, north of the Schreckhorn.

References

External links
 Kleines Schreckhorn on Hikr

Bernese Alps
Mountains of the Alps
Alpine three-thousanders
Mountains of Switzerland
Mountains of the canton of Bern